Charles McKenny (Sep. 15, 1860-Sep. 23, 1933) was president of Central State Normal School (now Central Michigan University), Milwaukee State Normal School and Michigan State Normal College (now Eastern Michigan University).

McKenny was born in Dimondale, Michigan.  He received his bachelor's degree in 1881 from Michigan State Agricultural College (now Michigan State University) and masters from both Olivet College and the University of Wisconsin.

McKenny married Minnie E. Alderman (1869–1942) in 1890.  She was a native of Vermontville, Michigan.  They had three children, Charles Arthur McKenny, Laurence A. McKenny and Marion Louise McKenny.  Laurence joined the Army Air Corps during World War I and was killed in action during World War II.

 
McKenny begin his career as a teacher at Charlotte, Michigan.  He then went to teach at Vermontville.  In 1895-1896 he was a professor at Olivet College.  In 1896 he became principal of Central State Normal School where he remained as president until 1899. In 1900, he became principal of Milwaukee State Normal School where he remained until 1912.  He then took the presidency at the Michigan State Normal College (MSNC), now Eastern Michigan University.  He started his administration at MSNC by instituting rules against female students having "gentleman callers' visit them in their rooms, only allowing them to visit in parlors.  he also instituted rules to cut down on automobiling and canoeing by female students, especially with males.  The student body of MSNC at the time was overwhelmingly female. During his presidency, he proposed and then oversaw the construction of MSNC's student union, named McKenny Union (now McKenny Hall) in his honor. McKenny remained president of MSNC until April 1933 when he became president emeritus.  He died the following September.

Sources
Eastern Michigan University archives, papers and find-aid biography of McKenny.
 Ypsilanti Daily Press, October 1, 1912

External links
 

Presidents of Eastern Michigan University
Presidents of Central Michigan University
Olivet College alumni
Olivet College faculty
University of Wisconsin–Milwaukee faculty
University of Wisconsin–Madison alumni
Michigan State University alumni
People from Eaton County, Michigan
1860 births
1933 deaths